Let's Go Our Own Way is a 2010 Slovenian adventures youth film directed by Miha Hočevar, starring Jurij Zrnec, Tadej Koren Šmid, and Jure Kreft in the title roles.

This film reached the biggest audience in premiere weekend in Slovenian cinema history. The film gathered record 18,686 visitors.

Plot 
Film is talking about scouts who spend their free time in nature. Aleks is camping near Soča river together with his friends. Starešina, the scouting leader is taking everything too serious and that cause a lot of problems. And boys are a lot more interested in girls than camp. The movie was filmed in ideal Triglav National Park in Slovenia.

Cast
 Jurij Zrnec (Starešina / Taborovodja) 
 Tadej Koren Šmid (Aleks)
 Jure Kreft (Zaspanec)
 Matevz Štular (Jaka)
 Jana Zupančič (Kuharica Majda)
 Luka Cimprič (Vodnik Grega)
 Uroš Kaurin (Vodnik Peter)

References

External links
 
 film-sklad.si - Filmski sklad RS 
 Let's Go Our Own Way - emotionfilm.si (slovene)

2010 films
Slovenian adventure films
Slovene-language films
Films set in Slovenia
Films about summer camps
Films about children
Scouting in popular culture